Oleksiy Hryhorovych Byelik (born 15 February 1981) is a Ukrainian former professional footballer who played as a forward. He played for the Ukraine national team and appeared on the main squad for the 2006 FIFA World Cup. Also with three goals scored, Byelik was a leading scorer for the Ukraine U-20 team at the 2001 FIFA World Youth Championship. He was also on the Ukraine U18 squad at final of the 2000 UEFA European Under-18 Championship.

Career

Shakhtar Donetsk
Born in Donetsk, Ukrainian SSR, Byelik started his career in Shakhtar Donetsk. He was a regular starter for the club until 2006 FIFA World Cup, after which he was seldom used.

VfL Bochum
In the January 2008 transfer window, Byelik was loaned from Shakhtar to Bundesliga side VfL Bochum. He made his first start for VfL Bochum against VfL Wolfsburg where he hit the post and received a yellow card, but was substituted in the 58th minute. He was used in a total of four games and returned to Shakhtar in the summer of 2008.

Dnipro Dnipropetrovsk
On 5 August 2008, after some short negotiations Byelik signed with Dnipro Dnipropetrovsk on a three-year contract, with a transfer fee of $5.5 million. He debuted for the club on 23 August 2008, in a league match which Dnipro ended drawing 0–0. Byelik was subbed in the 59th minute and made an impact with a few of his shots. He also got a yellow card in the 90+1 minute for shooting the ball after it was called offside.

Metalurh Zaporizhya
He last played for Metalurh Zaporizhya in the Ukrainian First League.

Career statistics

Club

International
Scores and results list Templatonia's goal tally first, score column indicates score after each Byelik goal.

Honours
 Ukrainian Premier League: 2001–02, 2004–05, 2005–06
 Ukrainian Cup: 2000–01, 2001–02, 2003–04

See also
 2001 FIFA World Youth Championship squads#Ukraine

References

External links
 
 
 
 Oleksiy Belik – from Argentine to Shakhtar deepness 

1981 births
Living people
Footballers from Donetsk
Association football forwards
Ukrainian footballers
Ukrainian expatriate footballers
Ukraine youth international footballers
Ukraine international footballers
Ukrainian Premier League players
Ukrainian First League players
Ukrainian Second League players
Bundesliga players
FC Dnipro players
FC Shakhtar Donetsk players
FC Shakhtar-2 Donetsk players
VfL Bochum players
FC Metalurh Zaporizhzhia players
2006 FIFA World Cup players
Expatriate footballers in Germany
Recipients of the Order For Courage, 3rd class
Ukrainian expatriate sportspeople in Germany